Fausto Rossini (born 2 March 1978) is an Italian former professional footballer who played as a striker.

Career

Atalanta
Rossini started his career at Atalanta. In 2003, he joined Bologna along with Cesare Natali in a co-ownership deal, but bought back in June 2004. He then left on loan to Sampdoria, along with Vitali Kutuzov as the replacement of Fabio Bazzani.

Udinese
In June 2005, he left for Udinese for €450,000 in a co-ownership deal along with Atalanta teammates Marco Motta (50% for €2.05 million), Cesare Natali, Massimo Gotti, Piermario Morosini (50%) and Michele Rinaldi (loan), in exchange Atalanta signed Thomas Manfredini and Antonino D'Agostino (50%) for a total for €2 million. Along with Barreto, he played as a backup of Vincenzo Iaquinta, Antonio Di Natale and David Di Michele (Di Michele left the club in January 2006). He played once at 2005–06 UEFA Champions League group stage. He also played all four matches at 2005–06 UEFA Cup as the Udine club rested number of regular starter.

In June 2006, Udinese signed Rossini outright for free and Morosini for undisclosed amount; Atalanta also signed D'Agostino for free.

Catania & Livorno
On 3 August 2006, he joined Serie A newcomer Calcio Catania in a three-year deal for an undisclosed fee. He played 16 matches and left for Livorno in next season, to replace the left of flagship striker Cristiano Lucarelli. With presence of Diego Tristán and Francesco Tavano, Rossini played 20 league matches in the first season, while 15 of them were substitutes. Along with Tomas Danilevičius, they followed Livorno relegated to Serie B and played 16 starts in 24 league appearances, behind the starting pair Alessandro Diamanti and Tavano. He then released in June 2009.

Bellinzona & Como
On 2 February 2010, Swiss side AC Bellinzona announced the signing of Rossini, which located in Ticino, an Italian speaking region. He joined the Swiss Super League team on free transfer. On 31 August 2010, he signed a contract with Calcio Como after trailed with the club since July.

References

External links
 Profile at FIGC  
 Profile at La Gazzetta dello Sport 2007–08 
 

Italian footballers
Italy under-21 international footballers
Italy youth international footballers
Italian expatriate footballers
Atalanta B.C. players
Bologna F.C. 1909 players
U.C. Sampdoria players
Udinese Calcio players
Catania S.S.D. players
U.S. Livorno 1915 players
Como 1907 players
Serie A players
Serie B players
Serie C players
Association football forwards
Expatriate footballers in Switzerland
Italian expatriate sportspeople in Switzerland
People from Grosseto
1978 births
Living people
Sportspeople from the Province of Grosseto
Footballers from Tuscany